Big Brother Albania 3 was the third season of the Albanian series of the worldwide franchise of Big Brother. It launched on Saturday, 23 January 2010, with twelve Housemates entering the House. The winner, Jetmir Salaj received a 10,000,000 Leks (€75,000) prize.
Big Brother 3 (Albania) aired on two cable channels 24 hours a day on the Digit-Alb cable network, as well as on two additional channels on DigitAlb Mobile. Daily reviews were shown Monday through Saturday on Top Channel. The eviction show aired on Saturdays at 21:00 CET, while a Sunday edition will close off the week.
The main host is Arbana Osmani, while Eno Popi hosted the Sunday morning edition called Big Brother Albania Fans' Club, featuring dialogues with eliminated contestants and fans of the show. The Big Brother Forum also returned this year.
This season will end up as the longest of all series running 113 days and ending on Saturday 15 May 2010.

Housemates

Controversies
This season of Big Brother had a lot of controversies starting from Klodian's coming out as gay. In one of the Saturday's shows there was shown a clip for both the housemates and the public of Klodian in the diary room telling that he was gay. Arbana called Klodian in the diary room to talk more about his sexual orientation. When he came out of the diary room all the housemates hugged him and told him that they would support him. But this thing didn't happen for some of the housemates, especially with Valon who claimed to be a homophobic and said that all the Albanians are as well. Two weeks after Klodian came out, in his hometown, Lezhë there were people protesting to Big Brother cast to draw Klodian out of the house. Klodian survived a lot of risks to be evicted and some people think that the voting may have been rigged to keep Klodian in the house until the situation in his hometown calm down. Also the American Ambassador and the European one showed their support to Klodian's family. The reactions from the magazines and the press were in the support of Klodian.

Right after the start of the fifth season of Big Brother Albania on Top Channel, the hostess of the show, Arbana Osmani made some really harsh comments about the cast of the housemates of the third season. Asked during an interview about which cast of housemates of which season she disliked the most, Osmani answered that she totally disliked and hated the cast of the third season because she thought that each and every one of the housemates of the third season were totally false and had no personality whatsoever. Osmani went on to say that Klodian Çela, according to her, was one of the worst people she had ever met and said that Çela used his homosexuality to make people feel bad about him. However, these comments weren't left unanswered by the other side. Shortly after the interview was published, Tatiana Sandei, one of the housemates of this season, stormed back at Osmani's comments defending herself, the cast of the third season and Klodian Çela, meanwhile Çela himself claimed to have been used by the production for his homosexuality and offended the hostess by making explicit comments. Klodian also claimed that the production of Big Brother offered to pay him just because he outed himself during the show although the payment was never made.

Nominations table

Housemates living in the Rich House
Housemates living in the Poor House

Notes

: In round five of nominations all-female housemates were given immunity by Big Brother.
: In round eight of nominations, all housemates that had been up for eviction in the previous round of nominations were asked to save one of the six that had not been up for eviction. Ada was the only housemate not to be saved and was thus automatically nominated for eviction. Following the vote, she was told to nominate two housemates that would be nominated with her. Ada chose to nominate Bertina and Eduard.
: In round ten of nominations, all housemates apart from Eduard and Manal were split up into groups of three. Each person in the three groups was asked to nominate one person in their respective group that would join Eduard and Manal in being nominated for the next eviction.
: In round eleven of nominations, each housemate had to open one of nine envelopes, one of which contained the power to keep one housemate from earning exemption. Seldi chose the envelope containing the power to prevent someone from the exemption and chose to give it to Eduard. As the last housemate to pick, Domenika was able to give either herself immunity or another housemate. She gave the immunity to Seldi.
: In the final round of nominations, the housemates were each asked to name one person they wanted to see in the finals. The housemate who received the most votes was then immune from the final eviction. As Domenika received the most votes she automatically advanced to the final.

References

External links
 Official homepage
 Big Brother Albania Forum

2010 Albanian television seasons
03

pl:Big Brother (Albania)#3 edycja